A floating hinge is a hinge that, while able to behave as a normal hinge, enables one of the objects to move away from the other - hence "float". In effect, the hinge allows for two parallel axes of rotation – one for each object joined by the hinge – and each axis can be moved relative to the position of the other.

Uses 

Floating hinges are used in flatbed scanners designed to scan thick objects such as books. If a regular sheet of paper is placed on the glass and the cover is lowered over it, the glass, the paper, and the sheet are very close together. If a thicker object is placed on the glass, an ordinary hinge would leave the cover at an angle to the glass; a floating hinge raises the hinged edge of the cover to the level of the book so that the cover remains parallel to the glass, but raised above it. 

Floating hinges are also used in two-plate electric cooking grills, as they allow for even heating of both sides of a thick piece of food without crushing it.

See also

References

External links

Hinges
Hardware (mechanical)